Phone Swap is an 2018 American dating reality television series that consists of potential lovers looking into each other's phones. This originally created Snapchat show premiered on Fox for a short period of time.

Background 
The series was produced by Vertical Networks and Elisabeth Murdoch.

Its the first show to migrate from mobile to TV.

Phone Swap was directed by Sun-Ho Pak.

Format 
For every episode, singles are sent on blind dates and are forced to swap each other's phones. Later in the show, contestants have to decide if they still want to get to know one another on a personal level.

Cast 

 Vivian Nweze as herself
 Asia Ifield as herself
 Dan Babic as himself
 Brinn Abbate as herself
 Tyrone Evans Clark as himself

References

External links 

 Phone Swap at IMDb

2018 American television series debuts
English-language television shows
2010s American reality television series
Dating and relationship reality television series
American dating and relationship reality television series